Yang Chin-long (born 5 June 1953) is a Taiwanese economist and the current Governor of the Central Bank of the Republic of China.

Yang received a master's degree from National Chengchi University and earned a doctoral degree in economics from the University of Birmingham. In 1989, Yang began working for the Central Bank of the Republic of China (Taiwan). Yang was named deputy governor of Taiwan's central bank in 2008. After Perng Fai-nan announced that he would retire upon the conclusion of his fifth term, Yang, Shea Jia-dong, and Richard Koo were considered candidates to succeed him. On 1 February, Yang was appointed as the new Central Bank governor.

Yang was listed in the Central Banker Report Card 2019, a list of the top central bankers compiled by Global Finance. In his first appearance on the list, he was given an A-grade.

References

1953 births
Living people
Governors of the Central Bank of the Republic of China
Alumni of the University of Birmingham
National Chengchi University alumni
People from Pingtung County